Marlelynn Lange-Harris (first name also spelled MerleLynn; born 28 April 1969) is a Canadian basketball player. She played college basketball for UNLV from 1988 to 1992 and later in the WNBA for the Phoenix Mercury.

National team career
Lange-Harris competed for Canada in the women's tournament at the 1996 Summer Olympics and in the 1986, 1990 and 1994 World Championships.

UNLV statistics
Source

References

External links
 

1969 births
Living people
Canadian women's basketball players
Olympic basketball players of Canada
Basketball players at the 1996 Summer Olympics
Basketball players from Toronto
UNLV Lady Rebels basketball players
Phoenix Mercury players
Undrafted Women's National Basketball Association players